Benjamin George Burton Fox,  (28 July 1912 – 6 November 1978) was a British Anglican priest and military chaplain. He was Archdeacon of Wisbech in the Diocese of Ely from 1964 until his death.

Early life and education
Fox was educated at King Edward VI Grammar School, Norwich, a private school in Norwich. He studied at the University of London.

Ordained ministry
Fox was ordained in 1936. He served curacies in Guildford and Bath. After this he was a Chaplain to the Forces during World War II. When peace returned he held incumbencies in Potten End, Bedford, Montego Bay (where he was also the Archdeacon of Cornwall from 1950 to 1955), Fulham and Haddenham.

Personal life
In 1943, Fox married The Honourable Margaret Joan Davidson, daughter of J. C. C. Davidson, 1st Viscount Davidson. Together they had five children; one son and four daughters.

References

1913 births
People educated at Norwich School
Alumni of the University of London
Recipients of the Military Cross
Archdeacons of Wisbech
1978 deaths